Pancheloniidae is a clade of sea turtles It is defined as all turtles more closely related to cheloniid sea turtles than to dermochelyid ("leatherback") sea turtles.

Genera
The following genera are placed here:
 †Argillochelys
 †Catapleura
 †Ctenochelyidae
 †Erquelinnesia
 Glossochelys
 †Glyptochelone
 †Itilochelys
 †Lytoloma †Osteopygis †Pampaemys †Peritresius †Porthochelys †Prionochelys †Procolpochelys †Retechelys †Thinochelys Historic taxon placement 
The following list of non-cheloniid pancheloniid species was published by Hirayama and Tong in 2003
 †Allopleuron hoffmani, later assigned to Cheloniidae
 †Catapleura arcansaw
 †Catapleura repanda
 †Ctenochelys stenoporus
 †Erquelinnesia gosseleti
 †Glyptochelone suyckerbuykii
 †Lytoloma cantabrigiens
 †Osteopygis emarginatus
 †Pampaemys meridionalis
 †Peritresius ornatus
 †Porthochelys laticeps
 †Prionochelys nauta
 †Retechelys platyops
 †Tasbacka aldabergeni, later assigned to Cheloniidae
 †Thinochelys lapisossea
 †Toxochelys latiremis, later assigned to clade Durocryptodira.

Cladogram 
Below is a cladogram showing the phylogenetic relationships of living and extinct sea turtles in the clade Pancheloniidae based on Lynch and Parham (2003) and Parham and Pyenson (2010).

References

.
Cryptodira